Claire Watt-Smith (born 1984) is an English entrepreneur.

Watt-Smith studied at Royal Holloway, University of London, gaining a BSc in Management Studies with French in 2005 and a Masters in European Business and Spanish in 2006. At the age of 25, Watt-Smith founded BoBelle a luxury accessories company, in 2009. The headquarters are in Somerset House, London.

In 2008, Watt-Smith was named one of the "Future 100 Young Entrepreneurs Of The Year". She has taken part in the Inspire & Mentor campaign of the magazine Marie Claire, in association with The Prince's Trust. In 2010, Watt-Smith was selected as one of 35 high-flying women featured by Management Today. She has been featured in magazines including Business Review, Cosmopolitan, Eve, Look, and Style.

References

External links
 Claire Watt-Smith home page on LinkedIn
 Claire Watt-Smith articles in The Huffington Post
 BoBelle website

1984 births
Living people
Place of birth missing (living people)
Alumni of Royal Holloway, University of London
English businesspeople
English women in business